Eucalyptus distans, commonly known as the Katherine box, is a species of small tree that is endemic to northern parts of Australia. It has rough, fibrous grey bark, dull, narrow lance-shaped adult leaves, flower buds in groups of seven, creamy white flowers and cup-shaped to hemispherical or conical fruit.

Description
It has rough, fibrous, finely fissured grey bark with white patches. Flowering occurs between March and April and the flowers are creamy white. The valves extend well beyond the rim and the seeds are blackish brown.

Taxonomy and naming
Eucalyptus distans was first formally described in 1980 by Ian Brooker, Douglas Boland and David Kleinig from samples gathered near Katherine Gorge by Clyde Dunlop in 1977 and the description was published in Australian Forest Research. Eucalyptus epruinata was described in 2000 by Ken Hill and Lawrie Johnson in the journal Telopea from specimens collected in Queensland but the name is listed as a synonym by the Australian Plant Census. The specific epithet (distans) is a Latin word meaning "remote", "far apart" or "distant" indicating that this species is separated from the similar E. microtheca.

Distribution and habitat
Katherine box grows on low stony ridges. There are scattered populations through the Northern Territory between Katherine and Gove with disjunct populations near Fitzroy Crossing in Western Australia and near Croydon in Queensland.

Conservation status
Eucalyptus distans is classified as "Priority One" by the Government of Western Australia Department of Parks and Wildlife, meaning that it is known from only one or a few locations which are potentially at risk.

See also
List of Eucalyptus species

References

Eucalypts of Western Australia
Trees of Australia
distans
Myrtales of Australia
Flora of the Northern Territory
Flora of Queensland
Plants described in 1980
Taxa named by Ian Brooker